The Zhongzheng Park is a park located in Xinyi District and Zhongzheng District of Keelung City, Taiwan.

The 25-meter statue of the goddess Guanyin on top of Zhongzheng Park is the biggest goddess statue in Southeast Asia and is one of the most scenic spots in Keelung city.

See also
 Keelung City

References

External links

Parks in Keelung
Geography of Keelung
Tourist attractions in Keelung